The 1908 Indiana Hoosiers football team was an American football team that represented Indiana University Bloomington during the 1908 college football season. In their fourth season under head coach James M. Sheldon, the Hoosiers compiled a 3–4 record, finished in a tie for fourth place in the Big Nine Conference, and were outscored by their opponents by a combined total of 70 to 43.

Schedule

References

Indiana
Indiana Hoosiers football seasons
Indiana Hoosiers football